This is a list of the seasons played by FK Budućnost from 1925, when the club is founded. The club's achievements in all major national competitions are listed.

Overall

In period before Second World War, FK Budućnost played in Montenegrin Football Championship, winning it four times - Autumn 1932, Spring 1933, Autumn 1933, 1934. Budućnost was the fourth most-successful team in Montenegrin Championship 1922–1940. 
The club from Podgorica played in Montenegrin Championship from season 1927 until 1935. At the beginning of 1937, as a team which supported workers' ideas, together with FK Lovćen, FK Budućnost was abandoned by regime of that time. During the next years, the club, under the temporary name RSK Crna Gora, played only few friendly, illegal games, against Lovćen and FK Velež.
After 1946, most of their seasons in domestic competition, FK Budućnost spent in First League (Yugoslav First League, First League of Serbia and Montenegro and Montenegrin First League. Also, the club played seasons in the Second League of SFR Yugoslavia and Serbia and Montenegro, and in the early days, three seasons in Montenegrin Republic League. From 1946, FK Budućnost won five national champions' titles - 2007-08, 2011–12, 2016–17, 2019–20, 2020-21.
Below is an overall score of all matches of FK Budućnost in official competitions since 1925. 

Note: Including 2019–20 UEFA Europa League, 2020–21 Montenegrin First League and 2020-21 Montenegrin Cup results

Honours and achievements

National Championships – 5
Montenegrin First League:
 Winners (5): 2007–08, 2011–12, 2016–17, 2019–20, 2020–21
 Runners-up (8): 2006–07, 2008–09, 2009–10, 2010–11, 2012–13, 2015–16, 2017–18, 2018–19
National Cups – 3
Montenegrin Cup:
 Winners (3): 2012–13, 2018–19, 2020–21
 Runners-up (3): 2007–08, 2009–10, 2015–16
Yugoslav Cup:
 Runners-up (2): 1964–65, 1976–77
Other competitions – 21
Montenegrin Championship (1922–1940)
 Winners (4): 1932, spring 1933, autumn 1933, 1934
 Runners-up (2): 1931, 1935
Yugoslav Second League:
 Winners (6): 1947–48, 1961–62, 1968–69, 1971–72, 1972–73, 1974–75
 Runners-up (4): 1954–55, 1960–61, 1969–70, 1970–71
SCG Second League:
 Winners (1): 2003–04
 Runners-up (1): 2001–02
Montenegrin Republic League:
 Winners (3): 1946, 1952, 1953
Montenegrin Republic Cup:
 Winners (7): 1949, 1955, 1955–56, 1956–57, 1966–67, 1967–68, 2003–04
International – 1
Intertoto Cup
 Group winners (1): 1981
Balkans Cup:
 Runners-up (1): 1990–91

Records

All competition
Biggest ever home victory: Budućnost - Rabotnički 10:0 (May 16, 1948, Yugoslav Second League)
Biggest ever home defeat: Budućnost - Hajduk Split 0:5 (December 15, 1946, Yugoslav First League)
Biggest ever away victory: Iskra Danilovgrad - Budućnost 1:13 (May 10, 1953, Montenegrin Republic League)
Biggest ever away defeat: Partizan - Budućnost 10:0 (October 29, 1950, Yugoslav First League)
Biggest ever home attendance: 20,000, Budućnost - Hajduk Split (August 27, 1975, Yugoslav First League)
Lowest ever home attendance: 150, Budućnost - Pljevlja (October 01, 2014, Montenegrin Cup)
Biggest ever away attendance: 60,000, Dinamo Zagreb - Budućnost (May 02, 1982, Yugoslav First League)
Lowest ever away attendance: 100, Milicionar - Budućnost (December 05, 1998, FR Yugoslavia First League)

First League
Biggest ever home league victory: Budućnost - Nafta 9:0 (March 16, 1947)
Biggest ever home league defeat: Budućnost - Hajduk Split 0:5 (December 15, 1946)
Biggest ever away league victory: Jedinstvo - Budućnost 0:5 (March 20, 2013)
Biggest ever away league defeat: Partizan - Budućnost 10:0 (October 29, 1950)
Biggest ever average attendance by season: 12,765 (1975/76)
Lowest ever average attendance by season: 989 (1993/94)
Longest unbeaten run: 24 match (September 27, 2020 - March 20, 2021)
Longest unbeaten run in league: 23 match (September 12, 2020 - March 20, 2021)
Longest winning streak: 10 matches (March 17, 2012 - May 09, 2012 and October 31, 2020 - December 17, 2020)
Longest run without conceded goal: 9 matches (August 18, 2016 - October 07, 2016)
Longest run without win: 13 matches (September 13, 1997 - February 21, 1998)
Longest losing streak: 6 matches (October 07, 1990 - December 02, 1990), (August 18, 1995 - September 30, 1995)
Longest run without scored goal: 5 matches (October 06, 1991 - November 17, 1991)
Most points in a season: 85 (2020/21)
Fewest points in a season: 10 (1949/50)
Most wins in a season: 27 (2020/21)
Fewest wins in a season: 3 (1949/50)
Most losses in a season: 18 (1999/00, 2000/01)
Fewest losses in a season: 1 (2006/07)
Most scored goals in a season: 82 (2011/12)
Fewest scored goals in a season: 15 (1949/50)
Most conceded goals in a season: 59 (1993/94)
Fewest conceded goals in a season: 12 (2006/07)
Best Goal Differential: +55 (2011/12)
Worst Goal Differential: -29 (1949/50)

UEFA competition
Biggest victory:  Valletta - Budućnost 0:5 (June 18, 2005, Intertoto Cup)
Biggest defeat: Budućnost –  HJK Helsinki 0:4 (July 13, 2021, UEFA Champions League),  HB – Budućnost 4:0 (July 22, 2021, UEFA Europa Conference League) 
Biggest ever home attendance: 10,000, Budućnost -  Deportivo La Coruña (July 09, 2005, Intertoto Cup), Budućnost -  Hajduk (July 19, 2007, UEFA Cup)
Lowest ever home attendance (in Podgorica): 2,000, Budućnost -  Rabotnički (July 07, 2016, UEFA Europa League)
Biggest ever away attendance: 30,000,  Hajduk - Budućnost (August 02, 2007, UEFA Cup)
Lowest ever away attendance: 300,  Tervis Pärnu - Budućnost (June 25, 1995, Intertoto Cup)

Players and coaches
Most performances:  Slavko Vlahović - 413/1 (1977-1991)
Most performances in First League:  Slavko Vlahović - 392 (1977-1991)
Top goalscorer:  Mojaš Radonjić - 84 (1972-1982)
Top goalscorer in First League:  Mojaš Radonjić - 52 (1975-1982)
Head coach with most seasons:  Vojin Božović - 10 (1946-1955)
Head coach with most games:  Vojin Božović - 199 (1946-1955)

Seasons in domestic competitions

Championship

Final placement by seasons
From 1927, FK Budućnost played 86 seasons in domestic leagues of SFR Yugoslavia, FR Yugoslavia, Kingdom of Yugoslavia, Serbia and Montenegro and Montenegro. FK Budućnost have five titles of national champion of Montenegro. 
Below is a list of FK Budućnost final placements by every single season.

Opponents in Montenegrin Championship (1925-1935)
FK Budućnost played in Montenegrin Football Championship from 1927 to 1935. During their first season, the club played still under the name RSK Zora. They didn't play in Championship from 1936, because the work of RSK Budućnost was banned by Yugoslav authorities, which recognized them as a team which supported workers' ideas. Since 1937, the team was renamed as RSK Crna Gora, but played only friendly games.

Opponents in the First League (1946-)
From their first appearance in Yugoslav First League until today, FK Budućnost played games against 73 different teams. In the table below are scores against all opponents, including home and away overall scores.

F - First game; L - Last game

First League playoffs
At the end of seven seasons, FK Budućnost played in the playoffs for placement in the First League. After the season 1994–95, as a champion of First 'B' League, the team played playoffs for placement to UEFA Cup.

* - penalties

First League attendances
Below is the list of attendance at FK Budućnost First League home games by every single season.

National Cup
FK Budućnost participated in 54 seasons of national Cup competition, since 1947. During their history, Budućnost played in Yugoslav Cup, FR Yugoslavia Cup and, since the 2006–07 season, in Montenegrin Cup.
Budućnost played eight times in the final matches of national cup - two times in the final of SFR Yugoslavia Cup (1963/64 and 1968/69) and six times in the final of Montenegrin Cup (2007/08, 2009/10, 2012/13, 2015/16, 2018/19 and 2020/21). The club won four trophies, in the seasons 2012/13, 2018/19, 2020/21 and 2021/22.

* - penalties

Seasons in international competitions
FK Budućnost is Montenegrin club with most played seasons and matches in European football competitions. Except participation in UEFA competitions, during the history Budućnost played twice in the Balkans Cup.
Below is the table with FK Budućnost scores in international competitions by opponents' countries.

F - First game; L - Last game

UEFA competitions
FK Budućnost debuted in European competitions at 1981, when they played in Intertoto Cup. In the next decades, Budućnost played in the same competition twice, with notable victory against Deportivo La Coruña (2:1) at 2006.

After the Montenegrin independence, Budućnost became standard participant of UEFA competitions, and played five seasons in the Champions League qualifiers. In recent period, most successful European season of Budućnost was 2016/17 in UEFA Europa League. After eliminating Macedonian side Rabotnički, Budućnost almost made surprise against K.R.C. Genk (2:0 in Podgorica after 0:2 in Genk in first match), but lost on penalties.

Overall

Matches by season

Other competitions

Balkans Cup
FK Budućnost played two seasons in the Balkans Cup, a regional competition for clubs from Yugoslavia, Albania, Bulgaria, Greece, Romania and Turkey. In their second season, Budućnost eliminated Galatasaray and played in the finals.

Matches by season

See also
FK Budućnost Podgorica
SD Budućnost Podgorica
Montenegrin First League
Montenegrin clubs in Yugoslav football competitions (1946–2006)
Montenegrin Derby

References

seasons
Budućnost Podgorica